Hack is the title of a current affairs radio program on Australian national radio broadcaster Triple J.

The show began at the start of 2004 after a shake-up of the station's programming.  The previous current affairs program, The Morning Show, from 9 a.m. to midday, was axed; the half-hour Hack was its replacement, from 5.30 p.m. to 6 p.m.

It was hosted by Steve Cannane until mid-2006.  At this point, Cannane left Triple J radio to become the current affairs reporter for their jtv program. One of Cannane's stories on Hack, "Petrol Sniffing, Pill Testing and the Cost of War", earned him a Walkley Award.  He won the Walkley Award for Broadcast Interviewing in 2006.

Kate O'Toole was Cannane's replacement as host of the radio program. O'Toole remained with the program until December 2010, she was replaced by Tom Tilley.

In April 2012, journalist Sophie McNeill was announced as host of the program with Tom Tilley becoming the face of Hack on ABC News 24, although he continued to be a reporter for the show. Sophie went on maternity leave in 2013, and Tilley returned to the host role permanently when she decided not to return.

In December 2019, Tom Tilley announced that he would be leaving Triple J to pursue other career opportunities, with Avani Dias being announced as Tilley's replacement. Jo Lauder, Isabella Higgins and Dave Marchese hosted the program for a short time in 2020 while Dias worked on a Four Corners investigation, with Dias returning to the chair shortly after. Dias continued to serve as presenter until December 2021 when she left to become the ABC's foreign correspondent to South East Asia. Dave Marchese was announced as Hack's new host for 2022.

The current Executive Producer (EP) is Clare Blumer. Recent EPs include Meghan Woods and prior to her, Laura McAuliffe who served as EP from 2018 to 2020.

Hosts
Current host
 Dave Marchese (2022–present)

Former hosts
 Steve Cannane (2004–2006)
 Kate O'Toole (2006–2010)
 Tom Tilley (2011–2012), (2013–2019)
 Sophie McNeill (2012–2013)
 Avani Dias (2020-2021)

Reporters
 Alex Mann
 Stephen Stockwell
 Sarah McVeigh
 Joanna Lauder
 Kaitlyn Sawrey

References

External links
 
Podcast on Apple Music

Triple J programs